Morval is a commune in the Pas-de-Calais department in the Hauts-de-France region of France.

Geography

Population

History

The Battle of Morval, a British offensive action, occurred as part of the larger Battle of the Somme in September. It destroyed Morval and nearby villages.

The village, including the church of St. Vaast, was rebuilt after World War I. The Commonwealth War Graves Commission cemeteries in Morval hold the graves of 54 British soldiers, while the Community cemetery includes the graves of two airmen.

See also
Communes of the Pas-de-Calais department

References

External links

 Website of the commune of Morval 
 The CWGC cemetery
 The CWGC Communal cemetery

Communes of Pas-de-Calais